This is a list of people from Mansfield, Nottinghamshire, England with a Wikipedia page. Names in sections are in alphabetical order. Information not on the subject's Wikipedia page must be referenced.

Armed forces
Sergeant Ernest Antcliffe (born 1898), World War I flying ace gunner, was born in Mansfield.
Wilfred Dolby Fuller (born 28 July 1893) won the Victoria Cross for his bravery on 12 March 1915 at Neuve Chapelle, France.

Art
Albert Sorby Buxton (1867–1932), painter, from Mansfield
Elspeth Gibson (born 1963), Nottingham-born fashion designer, who studied at Mansfield College of Art and Design

Business and professions
Nicholas Crafts (born 1949), economic historian
Watson Fothergill (1841–1928), architect, born and married in Mansfield
Gervase Holles (1607–1675), lawyer, antiquarian and politician, died and buried at Mansfield
Richard Jebb, Bt (1729–1787), physician to the Royal Family
Samuel Jebb (c. 1694–1772), physician and literary scholar, probably born in Mansfield
John Medley Wood (1827–1915), South African botanist, born in Mansfield, died in Durban
William Martin (1767–1810), naturalist, born in Mansfield 1767.
John Bainbridge Webster (1955–2016), Professor of Divinity at St Mary's College, University of St Andrews.

Literature
The ancestral home of Lord Byron, Newstead Abbey, is in nearby Ravenshead.
Robert Dodsley (1704–1764), bookseller, poet and miscellaneous writer, born in Mansfield

Music
John Balance (1962–2004), singer/musician with Coil
Cantamus Girls Choir (founded 1968) twice World Choir Olympic champions, is based in Mansfield.
Wes Dolan (born 1980), songwriter, musician and actor, born in Mansfield
Ric Lee (born 1945), drummer of the rock group Ten Years After, born in Mansfield
Leo Lyons (born 1943), rock musician, bassist of the rock group Ten Years After, born in Mansfield
John Andrew Howard Ogdon (1937–1989), pianist and composer, born in Mansfield
Carly Paoli, opera singer, born in Mansfield
Joel Peat, lead guitarist of the band Lawson
Alvin Stardust (1942–2014), singer, lived here as a child.
Charlie Starr (born 1981) singer, songwriter, tribute artist, born in Mansfield

Politics
Charles Brown (1884–1940), Labour Party politician elected as Member of Parliament (MP) for Mansfield
Ed Davey (born 1965), Leader of the Liberal Democrats, born in Mansfield
Sir John Plowright Houfton (1857–1929), colliery owner and politician from Mansfield
Sir Richard Charles Leese (born 1951), politician, born in Mansfield
Sir Arthur Basil Markham, Bt (1866–1916), industrialist and politician, served in 1900–1916 as Liberal MP for Mansfield Division of Nottinghamshire
(Harry) Bernard Taylor, Baron Taylor of Mansfield (1895-1991), coal miner and politician
Glenis Willmott (born 1951), politician, educated in Mansfield

Sport
Rebecca "Becky" Adlington (born 1989), freestyle swimmer, won gold medals at the 2008 Olympic Games in the 400 m and 800 m
William Barnes (1852–1899), professional cricketer; born in Sutton-in-Ashfield, Nottinghamshire, died in Mansfield Woodhouse
George Bean (1864–1923), cricketer; born in Sutton-in-Ashfield, Nottinghamshire, died in Mansfield
Gordon Albert Beet (1939-1994), cricketer, died in Mansfield
Peter Bircumshaw (born 1938), footballer, born in Mansfield
Donald "Don" Bradley (1924–1997), footballer, played for Mansfield Town as a left-back
George Butler (1810–1887), professional cricketer; born in Mansfield, died at Nottingham
Kris Commons (born 1983), Celtic F.C. footballer
Craig Disley (born 1981), Grimsby Town F.C. footballer
Brian Hill (born 1942), professional footballer, born in Mansfield
Richard Hodgkinson (born 1983), cricketer, born in Mansfield
Rob Kozluk (born 1977), footballer
Liam Lawrence (born 1981), former Mansfield Town footballer
Simon David Myles (born 1966), cricketer who played for Hong Kong, born in Mansfield
Steven "Oggy" Ogrizovic (born 1957), football goalkeeper, born in Mansfield
Gregory Clive Owen (born 1972), professional golfer, born in Mansfield
James Perch (born 1985), Queens Park Rangers F.C. footballer
Neil Geoffrey Pointon (born 1964), professional football (soccer) player, born in Church Warsop in Mansfield
Cyril John Poole (1921–1996), cricketer, born in Mansfield
Thomas Frederick Revill (1892–1979), cricketer, died in Mansfield
James Sadler (1830–1865), cricketer, born in Mansfield
Henry Shaw (1854–1932), cricketer, born in Mansfield
Lee Spick (born 1980), professional snooker player, born in Mansfield
Harry Thompson (1915–2000), professional footballer, born in Mansfield
Richard Daniel "Dan" Tremelling (1897–1978), professional footballer, played as a goalkeeper
John Whetton (born 1941), athlete, born in Mansfield
Oliver John Wilson (born 1980), professional golfer, born in Mansfield
Max Fricke (born 29 March 1996), Speedway GP Racer, born in Mansfield

Stage and broadcasting
Robert Aldous (born 1934), stage and television actor, born in Mansfield
Richard Paul Bacon (born 1975), television and radio presenter, born in Mansfield
Stephen Critchlow (born in late 1960s), character actor, born in Mansfield
Wes Dolan (born 1980), actor and singer/songwriter
Mark Henderson (born 1957), Tony award winning lighting designer, born in Mansfield
Holmes Herbert (1882–1956), character actor, born in Mansfield
Jack Manifold (born 2002), YouTuber and Twitch streamer, lived in Mansfield
Tom Scott (born 1984), comedian, YouTuber, and former presenter of Gadget Geeks on Sky One
Pollyanna Woodward (born 1982), TV presenter, born in Mansfield

Other
Barry Snowdon (born 1968), street hero and street sweeper, employed by Mansfield District Council

References

People from Mansfield District
Mansfield